Icelandic Braille is the braille alphabet of the Icelandic language.

Alphabet
The letter assignment is the same as in the Scandinavian Braille with the addition of certain Icelandic letters. There is even more overlap with the Faroese Braille. The base letters are the same as in French Braille. Note that c, q, w, and z are not used in Modern Icelandic, but are included so that foreign proper names can still be spelt.

Punctuation

UNESCO (2013) reports that  is both the mark of capitalization and the ellipsis. However, as they have wrong info about which letters mean which in the alphabet in regard to the Nordic countries, this information is not to be trusted.

References

French-ordered braille alphabets
Icelandic language